The Sea Beyond is a 2020 Spanish comedy-drama film written and directed by Achero Mañas. It stars Ernesto Alterio and Gala Amyach.

Plot 
Following the death of Carolina, the mother of Ernesto (a theatre director), the latter determines to steal the coffin in order to throw it into the sea, thus fulfilling Carolina's wish. He is accompanied in the journey through the roads of Eastern Spain by his daughter Cloe, who wants to change Ernesto's mind about his plan.

Cast

Production 
The screenplay, with autobiographical elements, was penned by Achero Mañas. The film was produced by Last Will Productions AIE, Tornasol Films and Voramar Films in association with Sunday Morning Productions SL, with participation of RTVE,  and Movistar+ and support from ICAA and the Valencian regional administration. David Omedes was responsible for the cinematography whereas Vanessa Garde scored the film. Filming began on 10 July 2018. Shooting locations included Madrid, the province of Castellón and the city of Valencia.

Release 

The film was presented on 23 August 2020 at the Málaga Film Festival's main competition. Distributed by DeAPlaneta, it was theatrically released in Spain on 11 September 2020.

Reception 
Desirée de Fez of Fotogramas rated the film 3 out of 5 stars, considering that it works its worst when portraying the characters' relationships with art, but it works better in its affective dimension, with Mañas proposing "solid" characters in the latter regard, describing human relationships with clarity, allowing himself for certain escapes into the extravagant.

Marta Medina of El Confidencial scored 3 out of 5 stars, writing that the film is "a plea in favor of bohemia, insurrection, heterogeneity", "a project without excessive pretensions, but with a lot of frankness".

Beatriz Martínez of El Periódico de Catalunya rated 2 out of 5 stars, deeming the film to be "somewhat dated", featuring "an enormous deal of self-indulgence" when outlining the characters and their actions, also assessing that, positive and luminous tone notwithstanding, the film is dragged by the "constant need to be giving life lessons".

Accolades 

|-
| align = "center" | 2020 || 3rd Valencian Audiovisual Awards || Best Supporting Actress || Magüi Mira ||  || align = "center" | 
|-
| align = "center" rowspan = "2" | 2021 || 76th CEC Medals || Best New Actress || Gala Amyach ||  || align = "center" | 
|-
| 35th Goya Awards || Best Actor || Ernesto Alterio ||  || align = "center" | 
|}

See also 
 List of Spanish films of 2020

References 

Films shot in Madrid
Films shot in the Valencian Community
2020 films
2020s road comedy-drama films
2020 comedy-drama films
2020s Spanish-language films
Spanish road comedy-drama films
Films set in Spain
Tornasol Films films
2020s Spanish films